Lieutenant General John James Frewen,  is a senior officer in the Australian Army. He joined the army via the Royal Military College, Duntroon and was commissioned into the Royal Australian Infantry Corps in 1986. He was posted to the First Battalion of the Royal Australia Regiment (1RAR), were he took up the role as Platoon Commander - 7 Platoon Charlie Company.  He has commanded the 2nd Battalion, Royal Australian Regiment (2003–04), Combined Task Force 635 (2003), the 1st Brigade (2012–14), Military Strategic Commitments Division (2014–16) and Joint Task Force 633 (2017–18), and deployed on operations to Rwanda, the Solomon Islands and Afghanistan. He was appointed Principal Deputy Director-General of the Australian Signals Directorate in March 2018, Coordinator General of the National COVID Vaccine Taskforce in June 2021, and Chief of Joint Capabilities in September 2021.

Military career
As a lieutenant colonel, Frewen commanded the 2nd Battalion, Royal Australian Regiment (2RAR) from January 2003 to December 2004. In this role, he was the initial international force commander for the Solomon Islands crisis in 2003. He commanded rotation 1 from initial deployment on 24 July until 19 November 2003. The task force comprised almost half of 2RAR, augmented by other Australian Army, Navy and Air Force personnel, and troops from New Zealand, Fiji, Papua New Guinea and Tonga. At its peak, he commanded 1900 personnel, four other ships, Australian and New Zealand helicopters, and two Australian Caribou aircraft. He identified the surrender of warlord Harold Keke on 13 August 2003 as the highlight of the deployment. Frewen was appointed a Member of the Order of Australia (AM) as part of the 2004 Queen's Birthday Honours for "Exceptional performance during operations as the commander of Combined Joint Task Force (JTF) 635 during Operation Anode from July to November 2003."

Frewen commanded the 1st Brigade from 2012 to 2014 and Joint Task Force 633 in the Middle East from 2017 to 2018. He was awarded the Distinguished Service Cross (DSC) as part of the 2019 Australia Day Honours for "Distinguished command and leadership in warlike operations as the Commander Joint Task Force 633 on Operations OKRA and HIGHROAD from January 2017 to January 2018."

Frewen was appointed Principal Deputy Director-General of the Australian Signals Directorate (ASD) on 1 March 2018.

On 9 March 2020, the Australian Defence Organisation established a COVID-19 taskforce and seconded Frewen from ASD to lead it. Frewen was appointed Coordinator General of the National COVID Vaccine Taskforce on 4 June 2021. The taskforce was responsible for coordinating the roll out of COVID-19 vaccines. Frewen succeeded Vice Admiral Jonathan Mead as Chief of Joint Capabilities in September 2021, but remained seconded to the National COVID Vaccine Taskforce until July 2022. In recognition of his "exceptional leadership during the COVID-19 pandemic", Frewen was appointed an Officer of the Order of Australia in the 2023 Australia Day Honours.

References

|-

|-

Australian generals
Australian military personnel of the War in Afghanistan (2001–2021)
Living people
Officers of the Order of Australia
People educated at Xavier College
Recipients of the Distinguished Service Cross (Australia)
Royal Military College, Duntroon graduates
United States Army War College alumni
University of New South Wales alumni
Year of birth missing (living people)